The grey-bellied flowerpiercer (Diglossa carbonaria) is a species of bird in the family Thraupidae. It is found in the Bolivian Andes and far northwestern Argentina.

Its natural habitats are subtropical or tropical moist montane forests, subtropical or tropical high-altitude shrubland, and heavily degraded former forest.

References

grey-bellied flowerpiercer
Birds of the Bolivian Andes
grey-bellied flowerpiercer
Taxonomy articles created by Polbot